Jimmy Mak's was a jazz club in Portland, Oregon's Pearl District, in the United States. It was established in 1996 and closed on December 31, 2016.

History

Jimmy Mak's opened in 1996. Owners included Jimmy Makarounis, aka Jimmy Mak, his wife and his parents. The jazz club hosted many groups, including some led by Mel Brown and Dan Balmer.

In February 2016, the building which housed Jimmy Mak's was sold for development. The club’s final performance was held Dec. 31, 2016. Makarounis died two days later, at age 53. He made plans to relocate the club to the intersection of Northwest 10th and Everett, in 2017. However, in November 2016, Makarounis announced that the venue's last show would be on December 31 (New Year's Eve). He told The Oregonian: It is with a heavy heart I make this announcement... As many of you know, I have been battling larynx cancer for these past four years, and I simply need to step away from the business to focus on healing and beating this disease, once and for all... This is the very last thing I wanted to see happen with the business, and we have explored many options for trying to keep the business open and to try to find another operator or group of investors that could keep the business going. Unfortunately, we have not been able to do so.

Makarounis confirmed Jimmy Mak's availability if someone wanted to re-open the club after a fully funded relocation. The venue's closure marked an end to Portland's most prominent jazz performance space.

There are plans to reopen Jimmy Mak's in the Pearl District in 2019.

See also
 List of jazz clubs
 List of jazz venues in the United States

References

External links

 
 

1996 establishments in Oregon
2016 disestablishments in Oregon
Defunct jazz clubs in the United States
Defunct music venues in Portland, Oregon
Jazz clubs in Oregon
Pearl District, Portland, Oregon